William Archibald Spooner (22 July 1844 – 29 August 1930) was a British clergyman and long-serving Oxford don. He was most notable for his absent-mindedness, and for supposedly mixing up the syllables in a spoken phrase, with unintentionally comic effect. Such phrases became known as spoonerisms, and are often used humorously. Many spoonerisms have been invented and attributed to Spooner.

Life and career
William Archibald Spooner was born on 22 July 1844 at 17 Chapel Street, Grosvenor Place, London. He was the eldest son of William Spooner and Jane Lydia Spooner. He was educated at Oswestry School (where he was a contemporary of Frederick Gustavus Burnaby) and New College, Oxford, where he was the first non-Wykehamist to become an undergraduate.

He was ordained deacon in the Church of England in 1872 and priest in 1875. In 1878, he became chaplain to Archbishop Archibald Tait.

William Spooner married Frances Wycliffe Goodwin on 12 September 1878. He had five children: William Wycliffe, Frances Catharine, Rosemary, Ellen Maxwell, and Agnes Mary.

Spooner remained at New College for more than sixty years, serving as fellow (1867), lecturer (1868), tutor (1869), dean (1876–1889) and warden (1903–1924). He lectured on ancient history, divinity and philosophy (especially on Aristotle's ethics).

Spooner was well liked and respected, described as "an albino, small, with a pink face, poor eyesight, and a head too large for his body". It was said that "his reputation was that of a genial, kindly, hospitable man." In the opinion of Roy Harrod, Spooner exceeded all the heads of Oxford and Cambridge colleges he had known "having regard to his scholarship, devotion to duty, and wisdom."

Spooner died on 29 August 1930 and was buried in the cemetery at Grasmere in Cumbria.

Spoonerisms

Spooner became famous for his manner of speaking, real or alleged "spoonerisms", plays on words in which corresponding consonants, vowels, or morphemes are switched. Few, if any, of his own spoonerisms were deliberate, and many of those attributed to him are apocryphal. Spooner is said to have disliked the reputation gained for getting his words muddled.

The Oxford Dictionary of Quotations (3rd edition, 1979) lists only one substantiated spoonerism: "The weight of rages will press hard upon the employer." (rate of wages) In a 1928 interview, Spooner himself admitted to uttering "Kinkering Congs Their Titles Take" (Conquering Kings). Spooner called this hymn out from the pulpit in 1879.

Many other quotations, "probable and improbable, were invented" and attributed to Spooner, including:

 "It is kisstomary to cuss the bride" (...customary to kiss the bride)
 "I am tired of addressing beery wenches" (weary benches)
 "Mardon me padam, this pie is occupewed. Can I sew you to another sheet?" (Pardon me, madam, this pew is occupied. Can I show you to another seat?)
 "You have hissed all my mystery lectures, and were caught fighting a liar in the quad." (You have missed all my history lectures, and were caught lighting a fire in the quad).
 "You have tasted two worms" to a student who wasted two terms.
 "You will leave by the next town drain" (You will leave by the next down train)

Spooner is supposed to have committed other absent-minded gaffes. He was said to have invited a don to tea, "to welcome Stanley Casson, our new archaeology Fellow". "But, sir," the man replied, "I am Stanley Casson". "Never mind," Spooner said, "Come all the same."

On his death, The Times recorded that "He was not afraid of conversation."

Works 

 The Moral Philosophy Of Aristotle (1879)
 Bishop Butler (1901)

See also
Absent-minded professor
Spoonerism

References

External links
Who was Dr. Spooner of "spoonerism" fame? (from The Straight Dope website)
The 'Brief History of The College' states that Dr. Spooner 'almost certainly never uttered a 'spoonerism,' but equally certainly had a number of curious verbal traits'. (From the website of New College, where Dr. Spooner was a fellow.)

1844 births
1930 deaths
People with albinism
Alumni of New College, Oxford
Fellows of New College, Oxford
19th-century English Anglican priests
20th-century English Anglican priests
People educated at Oswestry School
Wardens of New College, Oxford
Burials in Cumbria
Anglican scholars